Hollister is a census-designated place and unincorporated community in Halifax County in northeastern North Carolina, United States. As of the 2010 census it had a population of 674. Hollister's ZIP code is 27844.

History
Matthews Place and White Rock Plantation are listed on the National Register of Historic Places.

Geography
Hollister is located in southwestern Halifax County at  (36.255984, -77.935818), in the Roanoke Rapids micropolitan area. Its elevation is 246 feet (75 m). North Carolina Highway 561 passes through the community, leading east  to Interstate 95 and southwest  to Louisburg.

Demographics

2020 census

As of the 2020 United States census, there were 618 people, 275 households, and 165 families residing in the CDP.

Schools
Hollister operates under Halifax County schools. Hollister Elementary School and Haliwa-Saponi Tribal School are in the community. Hollister Elementary is a public school that enrolls students in grades K-5, and Haliwa-Saponi Tribal is a charter school that enrolls students in grades K-12.

References

External links
 Hollister, North Carolina at ePodunk.

Census-designated places in Halifax County, North Carolina
Roanoke Rapids, North Carolina micropolitan area
Unincorporated communities in North Carolina
Census-designated places in North Carolina